Lead acetate can refer to:

 Lead subacetate (Basic lead acetate), Pb3(OH)4(CH3COO)2
 Lead(IV) acetate (plumbic acetate), Pb(CH3COO)4
 Lead(II) acetate (lead diacetate), Pb(CH3COO)2 and the trihydrate Pb(CH3COO)2.3H2O